Antek is a Czech and Polish deminutive form of Antoni and Antonin that is used in Czech Republic and Poland.

 Given name
 Antoni "Antek" Cierplikowski (1885–1976), hairdresser
 Antek Rozpylacz ("Antek the Arsonist"), the nom-de-guerre of Antoni Szczęsny Godlewski (1923 in Warsaw – 1944, in Warsaw)
 Antek, the nom-de-guerre of Yitzhak Zuckerman, one of the leaders of the Warsaw Ghetto Uprising (1915–1981)

 Family name
  (1900, Allenstein/Ostpreußen – 1973, Bielefeld)
 Samuel Antek (died 1958), a violinist

 Pseudonym
 Yitzhak Zuckerman, a leader of the Warsaw Ghetto uprising.

See also 
 Police Chief Antek, a 1935 Polish comedy film directed by Michał Waszyński
 Anteks Stary Oskol
Antes (name)

References

Czech masculine given names
Polish masculine given names
Informal personal names
Polish-language surnames